Peter George Spenser Penlington  (born 13 December 1932) is a retired judge from New Zealand.

Early life and education
Penlington was born in Christchurch on 13 December 1932. His parents were Spenser Penlington and Marjorie Ethel Penlington. His great-grandfather, William Penlington, was mayor of Akaroa in the 1880s. He received his education at St Albans Primary School, Christ's College (1946–1950), and the University of Canterbury. He graduated with a Bachelor of Laws in 1956 and was admitted as a barrister and solicitor the same year.

Professional career

Civil law
Penlington started work as a clerk for R. A. Young Hunter & Co in 1951. In the following year, he changed to Wynn Williams & Co as a law clerk. In 1957, he returned to R. A. Young Hunter & Co, becoming a partner in 1959. He left in 1977 to set up his own practice. In 1990, he was appointed judge of the High Court.

He held membership of the prosecutors panel from 1968 to 1990. In 1974/75, he was president of the Law Society's Canterbury district. He was on the Law Society's national council from 1972 to 1974.

Military law
From 1956 to 1962, Penlington was with the Territorial Force and attained the rank of lieutenant. From 1968 to 1983, he was judge-advocate. From 1983 to 1990, he served as judge of the court-martial appeal court.

Awards
On 18 December 1978, Penlington was appointed Queen's Counsel.

Publications
Together with Justice Anthony Willy, he published the legal textbook Penlington and Willy High Court forms in 1985.

Family
Penlington married Gillian Beatrix Ramsden in 1960. They had two sons and one daughter. Ross Penlington (1931–2001), who was a Court of Appeal Judge in Hong Kong, was a second cousin.

See also
 List of King's and Queen's Counsel in New Zealand

References

1932 births
Living people
Peter
People educated at Christ's College, Christchurch
University of Canterbury alumni
High Court of New Zealand judges
New Zealand King's Counsel